The Angoulême International Comics Festival is the second largest comics festival in Europe after the Lucca Comics & Games in Italy, and the third biggest in the world after Lucca Comics & Games and the Comiket of Japan. It has occurred every year since 1974 in Angoulême, France, in January.

History 
The Angoulême International Comics Festival was founded by French writers and editors  and Jean Mardikian, and comics writer and scholar . Moliterni served as co-organizer of the festival through 2005.

Attendance
More than 200,000 visitors come each year to the fair, including between 6,000 and 7,000 professionals and 800 journalists.

The attendance is generally difficult to estimate because the festival takes place all over the town, and is divided in many different areas that are not connected to each other directly.

Official prizes
The four-day festival is notable for awarding several prestigious prizes in cartooning. The awards at Angoulême were originally called the Alfred awards, after the pet auk from Zig et Puce by Alain Saint-Ogan. In 1989, the name changed to the Alph-art awards, honoring the final, unfinished Tintin album by Hergé. In 2003, the Alph-art name was dropped, and they are now simply called "The Official Awards of the International Comics Festival" (le Palmarès Officiel du Festival international de la bande dessinée). In 2007, Lewis Trondheim (2006 Grand Prix winner) created a mascot for the festival, Le Fauve (The Wildcat), and since 2008 the prize winners have received wildcat statuettes, with the Best Album statuette coated in gold. Since this year, the award is called the fauve and the best album, the fauve d'or. The prizes were reorganized too, to create a pool of 40-60 albums, called "official selections," from which are awarded the "Best Album" prize, five "Angoulême Essentials," one "Revelation Essential" (given to rookie creators), and one Essential chosen by the public. The Heritage Essential (for reprinted material) and Youth Essential are selected from separate nominee pools.

Additionally, the Grand Prix de la ville d'Angoulême is awarded each year to a living creator honoring their lifetime achievement, and the Grand Prix winner becomes president of the next year's festival. Traditionally, the president heads the prize jury of the next year's festival, illustrates the festival poster, and is given an exhibition of his or her work. In 50 years, only three women have been awarded the prize: Florence Cestac, Rumiko Takahashi, and Julie Doucet.

Other prizes
 Prize for School Comic
 Prize for Young Talent (Prix Jeunes Talents)
 Prize for Young Talent from the Region
 "Strip" Prize
 Prize of the Students of Poitou-Charentes (secondary school)
 Prize of the Students of Angoulême (primary school)
 Prize for Alternative Comics
 Hippocampus Prize (for creators with disabilities) 
 Other prizes have been created on the margins of the festival, known as the Off Of Off. These  awards are the Prix Tournesol, the Shlingo Award and the Prix Couilles-au-cul, literally translated as the "Balls to the buttocks" award, deriving from the french slang expression for bravery, and who celebrates and encourages artistic freedom in artists whose activism is repressed in their home countries.

Prize categories

 Grand Prize
 Prize for Best Album/Golden Wildcat
 Special Prize of the Jury
 Prize for Artwork
 Prize for First Comic Book
 Prize for a Series
 Prize for Inheritance
 Prix Jeunesse 9-12 ans (Youth prize, 9–12 years)
 Prix Jeunesse 7-8 ans (Youth prize, 7–8 years)
 Fanzine Prize
 Revelation Prize
 Best promotional comic
 René Goscinny award

See also
 European comics

References

External links

 
 Awards 
 
 ActuaBD (in French)

 
Comics conventions
Cultural festivals in France
Multigenre conventions
Festivals established in 1974
Tourist attractions in Charente
Festivals in France
1974 establishments in France
Angoulême